Wekiva Presbyterian Church is a large congregation of the Presbyterian Church (U.S.A.) founded in May 1977.

The church is located at 211 Wekiva Springs Lane, near the intersection of State Road 434 and Wekiva Springs Road in Longwood, Florida, a suburb of Orlando.

Services are provided every Sunday morning at 8:30am and 11:00am.

Wekiva Presbyterian Church is a bustling church community, constantly providing its members a broad variety of fellowship opportunities and experiences including Sunday school service, Presbyterian Women gatherings, Vacation Bible School, youth groups, youth and collegiate mission trips, the Montreat Worship and Music Conference in Montreat, North Carolina, various musical ensembles, and writer's support meetings.

In January 2005, Wekiva Presbyterian Church became the first church in the United States to offer live worship webcasts, making its 11 AM Sunday morning worship services available free-of-charge online.

From 1997 until 2019, the pastor and head of staff of the church was the Reverend Dr. John A. Dalles, who is also known as a hymn writer.  His hymns are published in denominational hymnals in the United States, Canada and Australia. Following his pastorate at Wekiva, Dr. Dalles served as the Interim Minister and Head of Staff of the Shadyside Presbyterian Church in Pittsburgh, Pennsylvania.

The name of the church is derived from the nearby Wekiva River.  "Wekiva" is a Creek tribe word meaning "flowing water," an appropriate allusion to the Christian importance of the ritual of baptism.

Wekiva Presbyterian Church draws its members from Longwood, Altamonte Springs, Apopka, Lake Mary, Heathrow, Maitland, and Orlando. It is noted for quality worship, education and mission programming, and provides free-of-charge a tutoring program for elementary aged children called "Tutor House".

External links 
Church website

Presbyterian churches in Florida
American non-fiction web series
Churches in Seminole County, Florida
1977 establishments in Florida
Longwood, Florida